The 2021 UCI Junior Track Cycling World Championships were the annual Junior World Championship for track cycling hold at Cairo, Egypt from 1 to 5 September 2021.

Medal summary

Notes 
 Competitors named in italics only participated in rounds prior to the final.

Medal table

References

External links
Official website
Live results
Results book

UCI Juniors Track World Championships
UCI Junior Track Cycling World Championships
UCI Junior Track Cycling World Championships
2021 UCI Junior Track Cycling World Championships
Sports competitions in Cairo
UCI Junior Track Cycling World Championships